Fernando Carrere (31 December 1910 – 2 September 1998) was a Mexican art director. He was nominated for an Academy Award in the category Best Art Direction for the film The Children's Hour.

Selected filmography
 The Children's Hour (1961)
 The Great Escape (1963)
 The Pink Panther (1963)
 The Party (1968)

References

External links

1910 births
1998 deaths
Mexican art directors